Robert Arthur (23 July 1866 – 1948) was a Barbadian cricketer. He played in one first-class match for the Barbados cricket team in 1896/97.

See also
 List of Barbadian representative cricketers

References

External links
 

1866 births
1948 deaths
Barbadian cricketers
Barbados cricketers
People from Christ Church, Barbados